Milton High School is a government all-boys high school located in Bulawayo, Zimbabwe. It was the first government all-boys school established in Bulawayo. It was founded in 1910 and is named after Sir William Milton, administrator of the British South Africa Company. The school's motto is Greek and derived from the Biblical excerpt from Corinthians, 1 Corinthians 16:13, written by St. Paul to Corinthians in the face of Roman imperialism, and the Authorized Version translates it as "Quit ye like men". Milton school's connection with St. John's (the original Milton) is perpetuated in the new church in Rhodes Street where the central light of a stained glass window in the east transept in memory of an old boy, Alfred Perry, depicts the school's crest and motto.

History 
Milton School was founded on 25 July 1910.

The Milton Address 
The Milton Address, an annual address delivered to the school, began in 1972 to celebrate the anniversary of the school's founding. The first Milton Address was delivered by Sir Henry MacDonald. Following speakers included the Anglican Bishop of Matabeleland Robert Mercer, economist Tony Hawkins, Mayor of Bulawayo Mike Constandinos, Senator David Coltart. The 75th anniversary address was given by former Prime Minister of Southern Rhodesia Sir Garfield Todd. Subsequent addresses were delivered by notable figures including former President of Zimbabwe Canaan Banana, Anglican Dean of Bulawayo Robin Ewbank, British High Commissioner Sir Ramsay Mellhuish, writer Yvonne Vera, Vice Chancellor of Solusi University Norman Maphosa, and AIDs researcher Riita Dlodlo.

List of headmasters 

 E. D. de Beer (1910–1924)
 John Banks Brady (1925–1930)
 H. G. Livingston (1931–1941)
 L. R. Morgan (1941–1942)
 William Gebbie (1943–1946)
 Ball (1946–1950)
 H. Downing (1950–1955)
 Cecil Raymond Messiter-Tooze (1956–1963)
 M. Brett (1964–1969)
 R. K. Gracie (1970–1980)
 Erik Andersen (1981–1984)
 Harry Fincham (1984–1987)
 J. Mandikate (1988–1995)
 A. B. S. Senda (1996–2001)
 D. Swene (2002–2006)
 Ngwenya (2006–2013)
 William Ncube (2014–2016)
 Similo Ncube (2016– )

Notable alumni 

Allan Anderson, Pentecostal minister and theologian
Lewis Banda, Olympic sprinter
Kevan Barbour, cricketer and cricket umpire
Colin Bland, cricketer
Bobby Chalmers, footballer
Brian Chari, cricketer
Keith Dabengwa, cricketer
John Eppel, writer and poet 
Michael Loubser, Arts Foundation Creator and entrepreneur 
Percy Mansell, cricketer
Tafadzwa Manyimo, cricketer
Tawanda Manyimo, actor
Mpumelelo Mbangwa, cricketer and sports presenter
Thabo Mboyi, cricketer 
Tinashe Mhora, cricketer 
Nkosana Mpofu, cricketer 
Bonaparte Mujuru, cricketer 
Tawanda Mupariwa, cricketer 
Richmond Mutumbami, cricketer 
Njabulo Ncube, cricketer 
Methembe Ndlovu, footballer 
John Nyumbu, cricketer
Christopher Ridley, cricketer
Giles Ridley, cricketer
Hendrik Verwoerd, Prime Minister of South Africa
Brian Vitori, cricketer
Chris Rogers, rugby player

References

External links 
 Official website
 Pictures of Milton High School, Bulawayo Zimbabwe

Buildings and structures in Bulawayo
High schools in Zimbabwe
Educational institutions established in 1910
1910 establishments in Southern Rhodesia
Education in Bulawayo